Gun to Tape is a 2012 Kenyan documentary, directed by David Forbes, about Kenyan long distance runners David Rudisha and Edna Kiplagat as they prepare for the 2012 Summer Olympics. It was nominated for the Africa Movie Academy Award for Best Documentary at the 9th Africa Movie Academy Awards.

References 

Documentary films about sportspeople
Kenyan documentary films
Documentary films about the Olympics
2012 films
2012 documentary films
Films about the 2012 Summer Olympics
Running films
Sport in Kenya